Colonel Lord Arthur William Hill PC, DL, JP (28 July 1846 – 13 January 1931), was an Anglo-Irish soldier and Conservative politician. He served three times as Comptroller of the Household between 1885 and 1898 in the Conservative administrations headed by Lord Salisbury.

Background
Hill was a younger son of Arthur Hill, 4th Marquess of Downshire, by his wife the Honourable Caroline Frances Stapleton-Cotton, daughter of Field Marshal Stapleton Stapleton-Cotton, 1st Viscount Combermere. Arthur Hill, 5th Marquess of Downshire, was his elder brother.

Military career
Hill served as a lieutenant in the 2nd Life Guards. He was later a lieutenant-colonel in the part-time 2nd Middlesex Royal Garrison Artillery (Volunteers), and was appointed an honorary colonel of the 5th (Militia) Battalion of the Royal Irish Rifles on 5 April 1902.

Political career
Hill sat as Member of Parliament for Down and subsequently for West Down from 1880 (succeeding his uncle Lord Edwin Hill-Trevor) until 1898, when he resigned from Parliament in June by becoming Steward of the Manor of Northstead. He served under Lord Salisbury as Comptroller of the Household from 1885 to 1886, from 1886 to 1892 and from 1895 to 1898. In 1885 he was sworn of the Privy Council. He again held the Down West seat briefly from 1907 to 1908. Apart from his political career he was also a Deputy Lieutenant of County Down and a Justice of the Peace for County Down and Berkshire.

Family
Hill was twice married. He married firstly Annie Nisida Denham Cookes, daughter of Lieutenant-Colonel George Denham Cookes, in 1873. They had one son, Arthur Hill, who succeeded his father as MP for West Down in 1898. Lady Arthur Hill died in January 1874, shortly after the birth of her only child. Hill married as his second wife Annie Harrison, daughter of James Fortescue Harrison, MP for Kilmarnock, in 1877. They had one daughter. Hill died in January 1931, aged 84. Lady Arthur Hill died in February 1944.

References

External links 
 
 

1846 births
1931 deaths
Members of the Parliament of the United Kingdom for County Down constituencies (1801–1922)
Members of the Privy Council of the United Kingdom
Younger sons of marquesses
UK MPs 1880–1885
UK MPs 1885–1886
UK MPs 1886–1892
UK MPs 1892–1895
UK MPs 1895–1900
UK MPs 1906–1910
British Life Guards officers
Volunteer Force officers
Deputy Lieutenants of Down
Arthur
Irish Conservative Party MPs
Irish Unionist Party MPs